Carlo Alberto can refer to:
Carlo Alberto Guidoboni Cavalchini (1683–1774), Italian cardinal
Carlo Alberto Baratta (1754–1815), Italian painter
Charles Albert of Sardinia (1798–1849), king of Piedmont-Sardinia
Carlo Alberto Castigliano (1847–1884), Italian mathematician and physicist
Carlo Alberto Pisani Dossi (1849–1910), Italian writer, politician and diplomat
Carlo Alberto Salustri (1873–1950),  Italian poet
Carlo Alberto Biggini (1902–1945), Italian fascist politician
Carlo Alberto Quario (1913–1984), Italian footballer and coach
Carlo Alberto Dalla Chiesa (1920–1982), Italian carabinieri, assassinated by mafia
Carlo Alberto Chiesa (1922–1960), Italian screenwriter, film editor and director
Carlo Alberto Tesserin (born 1938), Italian politician
Carlo Alberto Nucci (born 1956), Italian professor of electrical engineering

See also 
Italian cruiser Carlo Alberto (1892–1920)
Collegio Carlo Alberto (established in 2004)
Carl Albrecht (disambiguation)
Carlos Alberto (disambiguation)